DeAuntae Brown (born April 28, 1974) is a former American football cornerback who played for one season in the National Football League (NFL) for the Philadelphia Eagles, two seasons in NFL Europe for the Barcelona Dragons, and three seasons in the Arena Football League (AFL) for the Toronto Phantoms, Grand Rapids Rampage, and Philadelphia Soul. After playing college football for Central State, he was drafted by the Eagles in the seventh round of the 1997 NFL Draft.

Professional career
Brown was drafted by the Philadelphia Eagles in the seventh round (227th overall) of the 1997 NFL Draft on April 20, 1997. He signed a contract with the Eagles on June 4, 1997. He was waived on September 2, 1997, after playing in one game with the team. He was signed to the Pittsburgh Steelers' practice squad on October 22 where he remained for the rest of the season.

Brown participated in training camp for the Steelers in 1998, but was waived on August 18 after being limited due to a quadriceps injury. He spent the 1998 season on the Steelers' practice squad. He was signed by the Seattle Seahawks in 1999, but was again waived during final roster cuts on September 6, 1999. 

Brown was signed by the Denver Broncos to a futures contract on January 10, 2000, and was waived during final roster cuts on August 27, 2000. He was re-signed to the team's practice squad on November 15, 2000, and stayed on the practice squad for the rest of the season. He was signed to a futures contract by the Broncos on January 2, 2001. He was allocated to the Barcelona Dragons of NFL Europe on February 28, 2001. Brown was waived by the Broncos on September 2, 2001.

Brown played in the AFL for three teams from 2002–2004: the Toronto Phantoms in 2002, the Grand Rapids Rampage in 2003, and the Philadelphia Soul in 2004. He announced his retirement on February 9, 2005.

References

1974 births
Living people
American football cornerbacks
Players of American football from Detroit
Central State Marauders football players
Philadelphia Eagles players
Pittsburgh Steelers players
Seattle Seahawks players
Denver Broncos players
Barcelona Dragons players
Toronto Phantoms players
Grand Rapids Rampage players
Philadelphia Soul players
Osborn High School alumni